Huna ben Joshua (read as Rav Huna BeReia DeRav Yehoshua; died 410) was a Babylonian rabbi, of the fifth generation of amoraim.

Biography
He was considered one of the most prominent Amoraic sages of his generation.

He was a student of Rava, who seems to have been his principal teacher, and who sometimes praised him, but occasionally blamed him. He appears to have been the pupil of Abaye also.

He was a colleague and a scholarly opponent (bar plugata) of Rav Papa, from whom he was inseparable, both in and out of school.

When Rav Papa became head of the yeshiva of Naresh (an academy that later was relocated to Mata Mehasia, a suburb of Sura and its Yeshiva there), Huna was appointed president of the general assembly ("resh kallah") in the same school.

During his studies under Rava, he earned his livelihood from a small landed property, enabling him to make the time needed for his studies. Later on, he became a business partner of his colleague Rav Papa, and earned his living from selling sesame.

Huna was wealthy. He never walked more than four cubits bareheaded. He ate very slowly, so that Rav Papa consumed in the same time four times as much and Rabina eight times as much.

Huna lived to a great age, outliving Rava by 57 years. Once in the lifetime of Rav Papa, Huna fell desperately ill, but his life was spared because he was forbearing.

References 

 

Talmud rabbis of Babylonia